Hoseynabad-e Pain (also Romanized as Ḩoseynābād-e Pā’īn; also known as Ḩoseynābād) is a village in Shaskuh Rural District, Central District, Zirkuh County, South Khorasan Province, Iran. At the 2006 census, its population was 125, in 36 families.

References 

Populated places in Zirkuh County